Brigadier General Bijan Assem (‎; born 1944 in Shiraz) was an acclaimed Iranian َAir Force commander and a national hero serving for the full duration of the Iran-Iraq War. His record qualifies him as an ace and one of the most successful commander of that conflict. He served the IIAF (1963–1979), and stayed on to serve in the IRIAF(1980–1988) when it was somewhat dangerous for high-ranked officers and pilots to continue their military service.

Education

 University of Tehran, BSME.
 Imperial Iranian Air Force Academy
 RAF: Special Training
 USAF: Special Training

Career
 TAB1 - Mehrabad International Airport
 TAB2 - Tabriz International Airport
 TAB3 - Shahrokhi Air Base
 TAB4 - Dezful Vahdati Air Base
 TAB5 - Omidiyeh Air Base
 TAB6 - Bushehr Airport
 TAB7 - Shiraz International Airport
 TAB8 - Khatami Air Base
 TAB11 - Doshan Tappeh Air Base
 TAB12 - Ghale Morghi Air Base

Missions

 Kaman 99
 Operation Scorch Sword
 Morvarid
 Liberation of Khorramshahr
 Attack on H3
 ...

References 

1945 births
Living people
People from Shiraz
Islamic Republic of Iran Air Force personnel